Huddersfield Choral Society is a choir based in Huddersfield, West Yorkshire, England.  It was founded in 1836, and is recognised as one of Britain's leading choirs. Over the years the choir has performed most of the major works in the choral repertoire, and has had numerous works commissioned for it, including works by Ralph Vaughan Williams and William Walton. 
The choir has made numerous recordings and broadcasts. Two of its albums made an appearance in the UK Albums Chart.  These were The Hymns Album (1986, #8) and The Carols Album (1986, #29).

The choir performs regularly with the leading orchestras in the north of England, including the Orchestra of Opera North, The Hallé, the Royal Liverpool Philharmonic, Manchester Camerata and the Northern Sinfonia. The choir performs with many leading conductors, known by the choir as their 'family' of conductors instead of having one Principal Conductor. Martyn Brabbins is Music Director  of the society and other notable conductors to work with the choir regularly include: Vasily Petrenko, Bramwell Tovey and Jane Glover (a former Principal Conductor and former Principal Guest Conductor of the choir).

In August 2016 Huddersfield Choral Society appointed Gregory Batsleer as Choral Director.  The team is completed by Associate Choral Director Fanny Cook, Accompanist and Assistant Chorusmaster Daniel Gordon, deputy Accompanist Malcolm Hinchcliffe and Musical Director of the youth choirs Alison North.

The choir remains an amateur choir, with membership open to all via a brief audition while maintaining its performing commitments.

The Huddersfield Choral Society was in partnership with the University of Huddersfield; however, this relationship ended in 2012 for funding reasons.

Discography

References

External links 
 Huddersfield Choral Society Website
 The Hymns Album - Huddersfield Choral Society

Organisations based in Huddersfield
Yorkshire choirs
Musical groups from West Yorkshire
Choral societies
Musical groups established in the 1830s
1836 establishments in England